KMYC (1410 AM, "The Patriot 1410 AM") is an American news/talk radio station based in Marysville, California. KMYC covers Yuba and Sutter counties, as well as Sacramento and other nearby population centers. It was originally on 1420 kHz and moved to 1450 kHz in 1941 due to the NARBA agreement. It moved to 1410 kHz in 1952.

KMYC Talk lineup consists of Chris Plante, Glenn Beck Radio Program, The Ben Shapiro Show, Sebastian Gorka, The Mark Levin Show, Jessy Kelly Show and Coast to Coast AM.

Weekend programing is provided by local talk shows Live with Lou, Great American Story with Bob Day, Mike the Wine Guy and The Dirt.

Programs formerly carried were Michael Reagan 1998–2009, Roger Hedgecock 2009–2015, The Rush Limbaugh Show 1998–2014. Jim Bohannon 1998–2012. G. Gordon Liddy and Laura Schlessinger 1998–2011. The Laura Ingraham Show 2011–2018. The Savage Nation 2011–2020.

In April 2020, KMYC was for sale following the death of station owner Tom Huth. The sale of KMYC and translator K282BS to E. E. Friesen was consummated on February 9, 2021, at a price of $50,000.

Station history
1998-     Talk radio Tom Huth purchases KMYC
2001-2011 Sporting News Radio
1994-2001 One on One Sports
1991-1994 Timeless (radio network)
1986-1990 Simulcast of KRFD "K-100" 99.9 FM
1984-1985 Country music
1979-1984 Adult Contemporary
1980 River City Radio Corp purchase AM/FM combo and increases KRFD to 50 kW
1960-1979 Top 40
1965 California First Broadcasting purchases the AM/FM combo
1964 Sister station KFRO changes calls to KFRD
1963 KMYC-FM changes calls to KRFO
1959 August 1 Carlton Broadcasting Corp. purchases the station
1957 Power increased to 5000w Day and 1000w Night
1952-1955 Broadcast moves to 1410 kHz - Power increased to 1000w
1947 Sister FM built KMYC-FM 99.9 Mc 4.7 kW (KUBA signs on the air same year)
1941-1952 Frequency change to 1450 kHz
1940-1941 Mutual Broadcasting System affiliate 1420 kHz - Power increased from 100w to 250w during the first year. Owners: Marysville-Yuba City Broadcaster (group also owned the Appeal-Democrat) Studio: State Theatre 519 E Street in Marysville

Sports
1990-2000, 2011, 2014-2016 Oakland Athletics baseball
2004-2005 Michael Porter's WrestleShoot wrestling (now on The Wacko Radio Network, formerly of Blog Talk Radio)
1998-2011 Marysville Indians High School football
1995-2010 Sacramento Kings basketball
1993-1999 San Jose Sharks hockey
1991-1993 California Golden Bears football
1991-1993 San Francisco 49ers football

References
 Red Van picture
 KMYC on 1450AM
 KMYC history
 KRFD callsign history

External links
FCC History Cards for KMYC
 The Great American Story with Bob Day

 
 

MYC
Companies based in Yuba County, California
Radio stations established in 1940